Konradów  is a village in the administrative district of Gmina Sośnie, within Ostrów Wielkopolski County, Greater Poland Voivodeship, in west-central Poland.

References

Villages in Ostrów Wielkopolski County